The Sunjiagou Formation is a geological formation in Shanxi, China. It is of Lopingian age. The lower and middle parts of the formation consists of intensely bioturbated fine grained sandstones and thinly interbedded mudstones, deposited in a shallow-shore lake depositional environment, while the upper part consists of fine grained sandstone, siltstone and mudstone. Alongside the Naobaogou Formation, it has provided an important vertebrate fauna.

Paleobiota

References 

Permian System of Asia
Permian China
Wuchiapingian
Changhsingian
Lopingian geology